Ram Kishore Saxena  D.Sc , FNASc is an Indian mathematician and Emeritus professor, UGC Jai Narain Vyas University and former Professor and Head, Department of Mathematics.

Published work 
Saxena has published 356 research papers; under his supervision many scholars has done PhD and post-doctoral research. Saxena has published books.

References 

Indian mathematicians
Living people
1936 births